The Elegest inscription is a Yenisei Kyrgyz inscription. It was found by J. R. Aspelin in 1888 on the left bank of the river Elegest, Tuva.

Discovery and translation

Region

Complete text

Notes

References

Further reading 
 Talat Tekin, 1964: "On a Misinterpreted Word in the Old Turkic Inscriptions."

Archaeological sites in Russia
Turkic inscriptions